Fonda is a village in and the county seat of Montgomery County, New York, United States. The population was 795 at the 2010 census. The village is named after Douw Fonda, a Dutch-American settler who was killed and scalped in 1780, during a Mohawk raid in the Revolutionary War, when the tribe was allied with the British.

The Village of Fonda is in the Town of Mohawk and is west of Amsterdam. In 1993, the Mohawk people bought land here to re-establish the Kanatsiohareke community  formerly at this site.

The Fonda Fair is an annual agricultural event that takes place in August.

History 

The village of Fonda developed near the site of the former Mohawk village of Caughnawaga, also known as Kanatsiohareke. Here the Mohawk had cultivated corn in the floodplain on the north side of the Mohawk River.

In the late 17th-century, Kateri Tekakwitha resettled here. She was a Mohawk girl who had converted to Catholicism and became renowned for her piety. She lived here with relatives after her parents died in a smallpox epidemic. She had survived it but was marked by scars. The village has a national Catholic shrine devoted to her; she is the first Native American saint. After French attacked the village in the late 17th century, Kateri and many other Catholic Mohawk moved to the Jesuit mission village of Kahnawake, established on the south side of the St. Lawrence River, opposite Montreal in Quebec, or New France. 

European settlers, mostly German and English, officially organized the present-day village in 1751 at the former site of Kanatsiohareke. The settlement was later named for Douw Fonda, a Dutch-American settler who was scalped in a Mohawk raid during the Revolutionary War. His family were ancestors of the American actors Henry Fonda, Jane Fonda and Peter Fonda. Henry Fonda wrote about them in his 1981 autobiography, as follows:

Early records show the family ensconced in northern Italy in the 16th century where they fought on the side of the Reformation, fled to Holland, intermarried with Dutch burghers' daughters, picked up the first names of the Low Countries, but retained the Italianate "Fonda". Before Pieter Stuyvesant surrendered Nieuw Amsterdam to the English the Fondas, instead of settling in Manhattan, canoed up the Hudson River to the Indian village of Caughnawaga. Within a few generations, the Mohawks and the Iroquois were butchered or fled and the town became known to mapmakers as Fonda, New York.

Nineteenth century to present
After the opening of the Erie Canal in 1825, Fonda thrived with the growth in trade and traffic that accompanied it. The canal provided transportation and commercial links to communities around the Great Lakes. Fonda became a center of cheesemaking, which was part of the regional dairy industry. The area was devoted to agriculture. As the county seat, it also did well with the arrival of the railroad in 1835, which increased cross-state transportation and shipping of goods. The village was incorporated in 1850.

In the mid to late-20th century, NASCAR held four races at the local Fonda speedway (in 1955, 1966, 1967 and 1968) as part of the Fonda 200. In 1973 the Caughnawaga Indian Village Site was listed on the National Register of Historic Places. It is the only Mohawk village in the country to have been fully excavated in archeological studies. The Walter Butler Homestead was listed on the NRHP in 1976.

Kanatsiohareke
In 1993 Tom Porter (Mohawk) re-established the first Mohawk community in the valley since 1783; he bought land in the Fonda area to cultivate corn and other agricultural produce. Other Mohawk joined him at this historic village site, naming their community Kanatsiohareke. This is the first land the Mohawk have held in the valley since being forced out in 1783 after the Revolution, when Great Britain ceded its former territories in the colonies to the United States. The name Kanatsiohareke means “The Place of the Clean Pot,” referring to a ten-foot-wide and ten-foot-deep pothole in the creek bed caused by rock scouring.

Geography
Fonda is located at  (42.954342, -74.375424).

Fonda is on the northern bank of the Mohawk River, opposite the Village of Fultonville.

New York State Route 5, New York State Route 30A, and New York State Route 334 all serve Fonda, with NY 334 having its southern terminus at NY 5 at the western end. Amtrak's Empire Corridor passes through the village, though it has no station here. Travelers have to go to Troy to get the train.

Demographics

As of the census of 2000, there were 810 people, 351 households, and 209 families residing in the village. The population density was 1,520.2 people per square mile (590.1/km2). There were 409 housing units at an average density of 767.6 per square mile (298.0/km2). The racial makeup of the village was 97.53% White, 0.37% African American, 0.25% Native American, 0.49% Asian, 0.12% Pacific Islander, 0.12% from other races, and 1.11% from two or more races. Hispanic or Latino of any race were 2.22% of the population.

There were 351 households, out of which 29.9% had children under the age of 18 living with them, 36.2% were married couples living together, 17.4% had a female householder with no husband present, and 40.2% were non-families. 35.9% of all households were made up of individuals, and 19.4% had someone living alone who was 65 years of age or older. The average household size was 2.29 and the average family size was 2.90.

In the village, the population was spread out, with 25.4% under the age of 18, 8.0% from 18 to 24, 28.1% from 25 to 44, 19.4% from 45 to 64, and 19.0% who were 65 years of age or older. The median age was 36 years. For every 100 females, there were 82.4 males. For every 100 females age 18 and over, there were 78.7 males.

The median income for a household in the village was $28,021, and the median income for a family was $35,714. Males had a median income of $28,333 versus $23,500 for females. The per capita income for the village was $15,330. About 6.7% of families and 11.7% of the population were below the poverty line, including 13.9% of those under age 18 and 14.5% of those age 65 or over.

References

External links
 Village of Fonda website
 Fonda Fair
 The Fonda Family

Villages in New York (state)
County seats in New York (state)
Populated places established in 1751
Villages in Montgomery County, New York
1751 establishments in the Province of New York
Populated places on the Mohawk River